Florian Ruiz-Picasso (born 21 February 1990), is a Vietnamese-born French DJ and record producer based in Cannes. By adoption, he is a great-grandson of the well-known artist, Pablo Picasso. He gained recognition for collaborations with Martin Garrix, Nicky Romero and Steve Aoki. In 2016, he was ranked by DJ Mag at 38th on their annual list of Top 100 DJs.

Early and personal life 
Picasso was born in Vietnam and was adopted by Marina Picasso, the granddaughter of the famous artist, Pablo Picasso.  After his adoption, he moved to Cannes, France, and has described the city as his hometown.  He was also raised in Paris and Switzerland. He started making music at the age of 13, when he would perform at events in his boarding school. He became more serious about his musical career at the age of 19. 

He currently resides in Geneva, Switzerland and Cannes, France.

Career 
Picasso has performed at major music festivals such as Ultra Music Festival and Tomorrowland. He has been performing in big clubs since he was 16 years old, has opened for acts like Swedish House Mafia and began headlining his own shows. On 27 April 2015, he released "Can't Stop" as a single with fellow producer Tom Tyger via Mixmash Records. On 16 November 2015, Picasso released "Want It Back (Origami)" as a single.

On 29 June 2016, he released a single titled "Final Call" through Armada Music under exclusive license from Protocol Recordings, a label run by Nicky Romero. The song peaked on Billboard's Dance/Mix Show Airplay chart at 39. An official music video was published by Protocol Recordings, it was directed by Fauns / Clubbing Vision. On 23 November 2016, it was announced that Picasso signed a deal with Spinnin' Records, with whom he released a single titled "Cracked Wall" on 2 December 2016.

Discography

Extended plays

Singles

Charted singles

Other singles

Remixes 
2013
 Tegan & Sara - Closer (Florian Picasso Remix) [Warner]

2014
 Benny Benassi & Gary Go - Let This Last Forever (Florian Picasso Remix) [Ultra]
 Christina Perri - Burning Gold (Florian Picasso Remix) [Atlantic Records]
 Steve Aoki & Flux Pavilion - Get Me Outta Here (Florian Picasso Remix) [Ultra]
 NERVO & R3hab featuring Ayah Marar - Ready For The Weekend (Florian Picasso Remix) [Spinnin / Free]

2015
 NERVO featuring Nile Rodgers, Kylie Minogue & Jake Shears - The Other Boys (Florian Picasso Remix) [Ultra]

2017
 Oliver Heldens feat. Ida Corr - Good Life (Florian Picasso Remix) [Heldeep Records]

References

External links
Official website

1990 births
French dance musicians
French DJs
French record producers
Living people
People from Cannes
Spinnin' Records artists
Remixers
Vietnamese musicians
Vietnamese record producers
Vietnamese emigrants to France
Vietnamese expatriates in Switzerland
French expatriates in Switzerland